Qobu is a village and municipality in the Absheron District of Azerbaijan. It has a population of 7,997.

References 

Populated places in Absheron District